Juan López may refer to:

Arts and entertainment
 Juan López Moctezuma (1932–1995), Mexican film director
 Juan López Fernández (born 1939), Spanish comic book artist, better known by his pseudonym Jan
 Juan López, secret identity of the fictional comic book character Superlópez

Politics and law
 Juan López de Palacios Rubios (1450–1524), Spanish jurist
 Juan Hernández López (1859 – after 1933), Puerto Rican politician and attorney
 Juan López Sánchez (1900–72), member of Republican government during the Spanish civil war
 Juan Fernando López Aguilar (born 1961), Spanish politician
 Juan López de Uralde (born 1963), Spanish politician
 Juan Carlos López Fernández (born 1965), Mexican politician
 Juan Manuel López (born 1983), Argentine politician

Religion
 Juan López (bishop of Coria) (died 1501), Roman Catholic bishop
 Juan López (cardinal) (c. 1455–1501), Spanish cardinal
 Juan López de Zárate (1490–1555), Spanish Roman Catholic bishop
 Juan López (bishop of Crotone) (died 1632), Roman Catholic bishop
 Juan López de Agurto de la Mata (1572–1637), Spanish Roman Catholic bishop
 Juan Damián López de Haro (1581–1648), Spanish Roman Catholic bishop
 Juan López Galván (1613–1674), Filipino archbishop
 Juan Guillermo López Soto (1947–2021), Mexican Roman Catholic prelate

Sports

Association Football
 Juan López (1892-unknown), Spanish football forward
 Juan López (1908–1983), Uruguayan football manager who won the 1950 World Cup
 Juan López Hita (1944–2014), Spanish footballer
 Juan Carlos Pérez López (footballer born 1945), Spanish footballer
 Juan José López (born 1950), Argentine football player and manager
 Juan Ramón López Caro (born 1963), Spanish football manager
 Juan Ramón López Muñiz (born 1968), Spanish football player and manager
 Juan Manuel López (footballer) (born 1969), Spanish footballer
 Juan Carreño López (born 1969), Chilean footballer
 Juan Carlos López Martínez (born 1989), Mexican footballer
 Juan Carlos Pérez López (footballer born 1990), Spanish footballer

Boxing
 Juan Antonio López (1952–2004), Mexican boxer
 Juan Pablo López (boxer, born 1972), Mexican boxer
 Juan Manuel López (boxer) (born 1983), Puerto Rican boxer

Cycling and driving
 Juan López Mella (1965–1995), Spanish motorcycle racer
 Juan Manuel López (racing driver), Argentinian racing driver
 Juan Carlos López (cyclist) (born 1981), Colombian cyclist
 Juan Antonio López-Cózar (born 1994), Spanish cyclist
 Juan Pedro López (born 1997), Spanish cyclist

Track and field
 Juan López (sprinter) (born 1926), Uruguayan Olympic sprinter
 Juan Miguel López (born 1967), Cuban triple jumper
 Juan López (parathlete) (active in 2000), Spanish Paralympic athlete

Other sports
 Juan López (rowing) (born 1934), Peruvian Olympic rower
 Juan López (rower) (born 1949), Mexican Olympic rower
 Juan Lopez (baseball coach, born 1952) Puerto Rican MLB coach with the New York Mets
 Juan Manuel López Iturriaga (born 1959), known as "Juanma", Spanish basketball player
 Juan López (baseball) (born 1962), Puerto Rican MLB bullpen coach for the San Francisco Giants, Chicago Cubs, and Cincinnati Reds
 Juan Martín López (active since 2006), Argentine field hockey player

Others
 Juan López de Padilla (1490–1521), insurrectionary leader in the Castilian War of the Communities
 Juan López de Hoyos (1511–1583), Spanish schoolmaster
 Juan López Pacheco, Duke of Escalona (1716–1751), Spanish noble
 Juan José López-Ibor (1906–1991), Spanish psychiatrist

Others uses
 Estadio Juan N. López, Mexican football stadium
 Juan López (cigar), Cuban cigar brand